PPTA may refer to:
 Ping Pong the Animation
 Post Primary Teachers' Association, a teachers' trade union in New Zealand
 Patliputra Junction railway station, in India
 para-Aramid or p-phenylene terephthalamide
 probabilistic, polynomial-time algorithm